The 1999 Skol World Darts Championship was held between 28 December 1998 and 3 January 1999 at the Circus Tavern in Purfleet, Essex. After five years, organisers of the Professional Darts Corporation scrapped the group stages and the tournament became a straight knock-out for the first time. The third-place play-off which had been a feature for the previous two years was also abandoned. The field was expanded from 24 to 32 players – the biggest influx of players since the PDC separated from the British Darts Organisation in 1992–93.

Phil Taylor emerged as champion for the fifth successive year, taking his overall tally to seven World Championships. He had now eclipsed both Eric Bristow, who won five World Darts titles, as well as Steve Davis and (at the time) Stephen Hendry, who were six times World Snooker champions – both targets of Taylor when he began accumulating world championships.

Seeds
 Rod Harrington
 Alan Warriner
 Phil Taylor
 Peter Manley
 Peter Evison
 Keith Deller
 Dennis Priestley
 Steve Brown

Prize money
The 1999 World Championship featured a prize fund of £104,000. The prize money was allocated as follows:

Results

Representation from different countries
This table shows the number of players by country in the World Championship. Five countries were represented in the World Championship, one more than in the previous championship.

References

PDC World Darts Championships
PDC World Darts Championship 1999
PDC World Darts Championship 1999
PDC World Darts Championship
PDC World Darts Championship
PDC World Darts Championship
Purfleet
Sport in Essex